Labo M (2003) is the third studio album by French singer-songwriter Matthieu Chedid in his persona as -M-. It's an all-instrumental work which, considering that one of -M-'s trademarks had previously been his inventive wordplay, caused some degree of discontent amongst parts of his fan base. Remarkably successful for an instrumental work, the album entered the French charts at number 27 but proved to be a stopgap with the full studio album Qui de nous deux appearing later the same year.

The album's title meaning "M's Laboratory", is a pun on La Bohème as well as the name of Chedid's recording studio.

Track listing 

 Tapis Volant 1
 Slide Melody
 Les Saules
 L'Automat
 Ricken
 Stan est Stone
 Au Kazoo
 Jam à la Mer
 Tapis Volant 2
 Coup d'Trash
 La Nébuleuse

References

2003 albums